Joseph Reeves (28 January 1888—8 March 1969) was a British Labour Party politician. He served as Member of Parliament for Greenwich between 1945 and 1959.

Reeves was founder and chairman of Camberwell Labour Party and vice-chairman of the Society for Improving Relations between Great Britain and the USSR. He served as secretary of the Royal Arsenal Co-operative Society's education committee. He was an Alderman of the Metropolitan Borough of Deptford.
He fought Woolwich West in 1931 and Greenwich in 1935 without success before winning the Greenwich seat in the 1945 general election.

Whilst in Parliament, Reeves was a member of the Party's National Executive Committee 1946-53 and of the committee of inquiry into the BBC.
He retired as MP in 1959.

References

External links 
 

1888 births
1969 deaths
Labour Party (UK) MPs for English constituencies
Members of Deptford Metropolitan Borough Council
UK MPs 1945–1950
UK MPs 1950–1951
UK MPs 1951–1955
UK MPs 1955–1959